Robert Williame (24 February 1911 – 31 October 1940) was a French aviator and World War II flying ace.

Background
Robert Williame was born in Saint-Martin-Boulogne on 24 February 1911 and was admitted to the École spéciale militaire de Saint-Cyr (Saint-Cyr Military Academy) in 1930. He opted for the Armée de l'air (French Air Force) upon his graduation two years later. Williame received his pilot's license in 1933 and was assigned to the 1ère escadrille, GC I/2 (1st Flight, Fighter Group I/2 (nicknamed Cicognes (Storks))) in 1935. He graduated from a parachuting instructor course in 1934 and was promoted to captain in September 1938. His unit was equipped with Morane-Saulnier MS.406 fighters in May 1939.

World War II
During the Phony War, he claimed a German Dornier Do 17 bomber as probably destroyed on 7 March 1940. After the Germans invaded France on 10 May, ending the Phony War, he shot down a pair of Junkers Ju 88 bombers on 5 June. Three days later he shot down three Messerschmitt Bf 109 fighters that were escorting a formation of bombers. Later that day, he shot down a trio of Junkers Ju 87 "Stuka" dive bombers.

After the Armistice of 22 June, GC I/2 was disbanded and Williame was transferred to GC III/6, which was flying Bloch MB.152 fighters for the Vichy regime. There he became commander of its 6ème escadrille and died in a crash while training near Salon-de-Provence on 31 October.

Bibliography

1911 births
1940 deaths
École Spéciale Militaire de Saint-Cyr alumni
French World War II flying aces
French military personnel killed in World War II